Sameera Aziz is a Saudi media personality, social worker, and businesswoman. She is a Jeddah-based Saudi national. She is an owner of Jeddah based companies 'Sameera Aziz Group' and Sameera Aziz Entertainment, the first Saudi production house in India. Sameera Aziz is the first Saudi female director in Bollywood.

Aziz has a weekly radio show, 'Marhaba with Sameera Aziz' in Asian Radio Live, based in the United Kingdom. She is an elected Saudi Director of United Nations' affiliated Global Sports Federation (GSF). She is a Chief Editor of business and entertainment related publications.

She previously worked with the Saudi Gazette newspaper as a Senior International Editor. She is the first Saudi novelist of Urdu language in Saudi Arabia. Sameera Aziz is appointed as an ambassador of Women and Children in Kingdom of Saudi Arabia by SPMUDA International Organisation.

Early life abroad
Sameera Aziz was born on 24 June 1976 in Al-Khober, Saudi Arabia, to Aziz-ur-Rehman and Mehar Afroz. She was the only daughter of three children of Aziz Ur Rehman; she has two brothers. Her early education was completed abroad, in Karachi's Gulistan Shah Abdul Latif School, and later at P.E.C.H.S. Girl's College and the University of Karachi. She married at the age of fifteen and completed her education after her marriage. Sameera has two children. She did her thesis for her PhD in Trade Relations, she received master's degrees in International Relations and Journalism. She then studied Film making from Hollywood and Indian directors in different time spans. and also completed furthermore Postgraduate education in the subjects of Mass Communication and Film Direction from Livewires-The Media Institute in Mumbai, India. She is doing PhD from Osmania University Hyderabad India.

According to a book Sold For Dowry, Sameera Aziz was sold as a bride and was denied to continue her further education as promised. According to the Saudi customs, a groom gives the dowry amount to bride, but it is claimed in Sold For Dowry that Sameera was unaware about her dowry amount taken by her step mother on her behalf and she was only told that she will be permitted to take her further education and career in Media after marriage.

Career

Aziz is a Chief Editor of Business and entertainment publications. Earlier, she was the president of Asian Information Agency (AIA), a Worldwide News Service; and the Saudi Country Head of South Asian Regional Information Agency, voice of SAARC countries (SARIA). She was also the Bureau Chief of the first Saudi independent English news website The Peninsula Times.

Till the year of 2013, she was a senior editor of the Jeddah-based Saudi Gazette, one of the two English language newspapers printed in the country. Until it ceased publication in 2009, Sameera Aziz was simultaneously managing editor of Awaz, a youth-oriented weekly Urdu newspaper, published by parent company Okaz. She was also the Managing Editor of Fresh, a quarterly magazine published under Saudi Gazette by the marketing department of Okaz publications.

She formerly served as a writer for Gulf News and several other Pakistan-based newspapers (during 1999). She also served as the supervising editor of the women's sections in Urdu News and Urdu Magazine, owned by Saudi Research and Marketing Group. Her columns and features are written exclusively in English and Urdu and translated into other languages. She focuses on Saudi domestic, social, cultural, educational and expatriate's issues as well as Saudi Arabia's relationship with the international community. She conducted undercover sting operations. Some of her work focused on the challenges of social and labour issues, human rights, women's rights, violence against children, and other issues of concern to the community. Aziz is known as a human rights' volunteer. She has worked for the awareness against child marriage. She had also shattered a wall of silence about domestic violence after a TV presenter Rania Al-Baz was savagely assaulted by her husband in 2004. In 2009, she shocked everyone when she wrote and spoke about child abuse that she witnessed.

Aziz is the supporter of women driving in Saudi Arabia. However, she does not support civil disobedience. She candidly asked mercy and kindness for those women in Saudi Arabia who defied their nation's de facto ban on women driving by getting behind the steering wheel. She also runs a social media campaign #SupportSmile with her team of Desi Vines, and The Khalli Walli Show to promote the culture of smiles, Love and peace. Aziz also acts as a consultant to various international organisations for social development and human rights like National Society for Human Rights (NSHR), We-The Youth and Society For International Peace. She is also the special adviser of 'International Affairs and Women's Rights' in Journalist Foundation.

Aziz is the First Saudi novelist of Urdu Language in Saudi Arabia. She was criticized for her feminist writings. Aziz became a voice while highlighting Saudi employers' issues. She spoke about the ill-treatment and crimes against domestic workers in Saudi Arabia. She has a passion to bridge the gap between the Saudi Arabia and the rest of the world. In her interview, she stated that she aims to clear up the misconceptions about Saudi Arabia. Sameera Aziz was the most awaited speaker at Pakistan's first-ever International Media Conference titled One World One Media, which was organised by the Pakistan Federal Union of Journalists from 1 to 3 May 2015 in Karachi, Pakistan.

She was also the only female speaker of an International Day for the Elimination of Violence against Women in Jeddah on 10 December 2014, which was the last day of UN women's 16-days global campaign of Activism against Gender Violence. The event was organized by The National Society of Human Rights. She talked against the international criticism that Saudi Arabia has often faced for lacking laws that protect women and domestic workers against abuse. "But this is not the case anymore. Saudi Arabia has outlawed domestic violence and this problem is already being acknowledged here. There is a legal ban on physical and sexual violence and other forms of abuse against women in Saudi Arabia, which applies both at home or within the work place," she said.

Her poems in Urdu language have published in various magazines and newspapers in the past. She has reportedly participated in many prominent poetic symposiums with appreciation awards. She was harshly criticized as Man-hater when she enraged scores of male audiences for boldly presenting her Ghazal against men and male-dominated society in 1999 at a jam-packed auditorium in Jeddah, Saudi Arabia. However, she got the standing ovation from female audience and some male audience as she left the hall. In July 2006, she wrote a heart-wrenching anthem 'Lahu Lahu Lebanon' (Lebanon under blood) for her campaign to support Lebanese victims in 2006 Lebanon War, also called 'the 2006 Israel–Hezbollah War'. Aziz received permanent honor of one of the top 100 influential media members list under the hospitality of Saudi Arabian Society for Culture & Arts in Madina City under the Saudi Ministry of Culture.

She worked as a production team member of Kauthar Media in Jeddah, Saudi Arabia. She worked with a Saudi producer, actor, and director Dr. Fahad Ghazoli as his assistant in many Saudi projects like film 'Lamar', Comedy stage play 'Hala Barra' and a Drama serial of 12 episodes. She was also an assistant and the production team member of director Majed Azzi for film 'Hayath' produced by Al-Mpda Media. In the past, she has written, directed and acted in a women-only comedy stage play which was presented by 'Silsila organization for women' in Jeddah, Saudi Arabia.

Aziz introduced the strategy of using Sports for the Cultural and Business exchange to strengthen Saudi economy. She has been elected as the Director of United Nations' affiliated Global Sports Federation (GSF). She was chosen by 83 countries of the world out of 158. This apex body of the federation will lead world sports for next three years. The Global Sports Federation is working for bringing peace through sports. “I have been serving internationally in Radio, Theatre, conferences as a speaker and writer, but Sports and film production are the most powerful mediums of Mass-Media to convey the message. This is the reason I am utilizing these platforms too,” she stated.

Sameera Aziz owns Group of Companies which comprised an Ad & PR Agency, Events, Workshops, Cleaning & Hygiene Products Queen Detergent, perishable and imperishable food, Import & Export Trading, Marketing, Printing, Publishing, Distribution services, and Magazines. She launched chain stores with the brand name of 'Khumasiyat and PayLess.' Her Production House Sameera Aziz Entertainment is located in Saudi Arabian city of Jeddah which is interlinked with her Bollywood Production House services in India. Her Events Company won Guinness World Record on making World Biggest Mosaic human picture in Jeddah Saudi Arabia in 2017.

Awards

See also

 Newspapers in Saudi Arabia
 Media of Saudi Arabia

References

Additional sources
 Saudi In Focus
 Pride of Pakistan biography
 An article on Sameera Aziz – From obscurity to fame
 Sally Buzbee, "Beyond the Veil – Female Saudi Arabian Journalists", Columbia Journalism Review, September 2001, Volume: 40 Issue: 3 Page: 22.

External links

Sameera Aziz Official Website
Sameera Aziz Entertainment
Asian Radio Live
SARIA News Agency
Urdu Talk Radio Interview
Interview of Sameera Aziz at MBC
Sameera Aziz in Kalam AlNawaeem

Saudi Arabian journalists
Saudi Arabian novelists
Saudi Arabian women
1979 births
Living people
Saudi Arabian people of Pakistani descent